KBRQ (102.5 FM, "The Bear") is a radio station broadcasting an active rock format. Licensed to Hillsboro, Texas, United States, the station serves the Waco area.  The station is currently owned by iHeartMedia, Inc. and features programming from Westwood One.  Its studios are located on Highway 6 in Waco, and its transmitter is located west of West, Texas.

History

102.5 was activated in 1959 as KHBR-FM. The relatively low-powered station (3,200 watts ERP for most of its time as KHBR-FM) had its antenna side mounted on the KHBR (AM) tower on Country Club Road in Hillsboro. It operated as a simulcast of KHBR and continued the day format at night on 102.5. The station was spun off in 1983 to interests in Cleburne, Texas, becoming KJNE on September 14 of that year. The station raised power to 32,000 watts and operated with an emphasis on the Lake Whitney area. Eventually a CP was granted to relocate the station to a site roughly midway between city of Hillsboro and the desired target area of Waco. Power was raised to 100,000 watts and the height increased to 500 feet.

On February 1, 1994, the station changed its call sign to the current KBRQ.

KJNE went on air as a country station, and later changed to Classic Rock.

KBRQ and KLFX out of Killeen share the same active rock programming and weekend shows.

References

External links

BRQ
Radio stations established in 1959
Active rock radio stations in the United States
IHeartMedia radio stations